Bittiolum alternatum is a species of sea snail, a marine gastropod mollusk in the family Cerithiidae.

Distribution

Description 
The maximum recorded shell length is 8.3 mm.

Habitat 
The minimum recorded depth for this species is 0 m, maximum recorded depth is 37 m.

References

External links

Cerithiidae
Gastropods described in 1822